Tolsti Vrh is a settlement in the Municipality of Slovenske Konjice in eastern Slovenia. It lies on the southern slopes of the Mount Konjice hills south of the town of Slovenske Konjice. The area is part of the traditional region of Styria. The municipality is now included in the Savinja Statistical Region.

References

External links
Tolsti Vrh at Geopedia

Populated places in the Municipality of Slovenske Konjice